William Barrington may refer to:

William Barrington (English politician), English MP for St Germans 1588–1589
William Barrington, 2nd Viscount Barrington (1717–1793), British MP for Berwick and for Plymouth, Secretary at War and Chancellor of the Exchequer
William Barrington, 6th Viscount Barrington (1793–1867), British MP for Berkshire, chairman of Great Western Railway
William Barrington (diplomat) (1842–1922), his son, British Ambassador to Argentine and Sweden
William Barrington (Irish politician), Irish Member of the Seanad Éireann 1922–1931

See also
William Barrington-Coupe (1931–2014), British record producer